The Beach is a 2000 adventure drama film directed by Danny Boyle, from a screenplay by John Hodge, based on the 1996 novel of the same name by Alex Garland. The film stars Leonardo DiCaprio, Tilda Swinton, Virginie Ledoyen, Guillaume Canet, and Robert Carlyle. It was filmed on the Thai island of Ko Phi Phi Le.

The film was a moderate box office success but received mixed-to-negative reviews from critics. DiCaprio was nominated for the Golden Raspberry Award for Worst Actor (lost to John Travolta as Terl from Battlefield Earth and as Russ Richards in Lucky Numbers).

Plot
Richard, a young American seeking adventure in Bangkok, stays in a drab travelers' hotel on Khao San Road where he meets a young French couple, Françoise and Étienne. He also meets Daffy, who tells him of a pristine, uninhabited island in the Gulf of Thailand with a beautiful hidden beach. Daffy explains that he settled there in secret several years earlier, but difficulties arose and he left. Daffy commits suicide, leaving Richard a map to the island. Richard persuades Françoise and Étienne to accompany him to the island, and the three travel to Ko Samui. Richard meets two American surfers who have heard rumors of the island and he gives them a copy of the map.

En route to the island, Richard becomes infatuated with Françoise. After swimming to the island from a neighbouring island, they find a cannabis plantation guarded by armed Thai farmers. Avoiding detection, they make their way across the island and meet Keaty, who brings them to a community of travellers living on the island in secret. Sal, the community's English leader, explains that the farmers allow them to stay so long as they keep to themselves and do not allow any more travelers to come to the island. Richard lies that they have not shown the map to anyone else. The trio becomes integrated into the community.

One night, Françoise invites Richard to the beach, where she tells him that she is falling in love with him and they start an affair.  Despite hoping to keep it secret, the community finds out. Although he is angry, Étienne says he will not stand in their way if Françoise is happier with Richard.

Sal selects Richard to accompany her on a supply run to Ko Pha Ngan. They encounter the American surfers who are preparing to search for the island and mention Richard's map. Sal is upset but believes Richard when he says they have no map. To ensure that Sal will not tell the rest of the island about the map, Richard has sex with her at her order.  On their return to the island, Richard lies to Françoise about having had sex with Sal. 

Three of the community fishermen are attacked by a shark while spearfishing. One is killed and another, Christo, is severely injured. Now terrified of the water, Christo refuses to be taken to the mainland for medical treatment and Sal refuses to allow any doctors to be brought to the island to treat him. As the man's condition worsens, the islanders simply leave him in the jungle to die, but Etienne and Françoise refuse to abandon him. 

When the surfers turn up on the neighboring island, Sal orders Richard to send them away and destroy their map. She tells everyone that she and Richard had sex, which leaves Françoise angry and heartbroken, causing her to return to Étienne. Isolated from the group, Richard begins to lose his sanity, imagining that he is conversing with the deceased Daffy.

The surfers reach the island but are discovered and killed by the farmers. Shocked at witnessing their deaths, Richard smothers Christo to put him out of his misery and gathers Françoise and Étienne to leave the island.

Richard is captured by the farmers along with Françoise and Étienne. The farmers are furious with the community for breaking their deal not to allow any more newcomers. The lead farmer gives Sal a gun loaded with a single bullet and orders her to make a choice: kill Richard and the group will be allowed to stay, or else they must all leave immediately. Sal pulls the trigger, but the chamber is empty. Shocked by her willingness to commit murder, the other members of the community abandon Sal, leave the island, and go their separate ways.

Back in the United States, Richard receives an email at an Internet cafe from Françoise with a nostalgic group photograph of the beach community in happier times.

Cast

 Leonardo DiCaprio as Richard, a freelance traveler.
 Tilda Swinton as Sal, the leader of the beach community.
 Virginie Ledoyen as Françoise, the girlfriend of Étienne, and Richard's love interest.
 Guillaume Canet as Étienne, the boyfriend of Françoise.
 Robert Carlyle as Daffy, the eccentric former member of the beach community.
 Paterson Joseph as Keaty, a member of the beach community who loves cricket.
 Lars Arentz-Hansen as Bugs, Sal's South-African boyfriend and the beach community's carpenter.
 Daniel Caltagirone as Unhygienix, the beach community's chef who has an obsession with soap due to having to always prepare the fish for consumption.
 Staffan Kihlbom, Jukka Hiltunen, and Magnus Lindgren as Christo, Karl, and Sten, the beach community's Swedish fishermen.
 Victoria Smurfit as Weathergirl, a member of the beach community whose tightening pelvis has been a sign for rain.
 Zelda Tinska and Lidija Zovkić as Sonja and Mirjana, two beach community members who come from Sarajevo.
 Samuel Gough as Guitarman, the beach community's residential guitarist who is not a good singer.
 Peter Youngblood Hills and Jerry Swindall as Zeph and Sammy, two Americans whom Richard meets in Ko Samui.
 Saskia Mulder and Simone Huber as Hilda and Eva, two women who accompany Zeph and Sammy to the island.
 Peter Gevisser as Gregorio, an Italian member of the beach community.
 Abhijati 'Meuk' Jusakul as the leader of the cannabis farmers.

Production

Ewan McGregor was cast as the main character before leaving due to disputes with the director. It was speculated that Boyle was offered additional funding under the condition that DiCaprio be cast and his character made American. Whilst promoting T2 Trainspotting on The Graham Norton Show, the dispute was discussed in more depth, with McGregor stating "It was a mis-handling and a mis-understanding over the film and it's a big regret of mine that it went on for so very long... and it didn't matter about The Beach, it was never about that. It was about our friendship. I felt like Danny's actor and it made me a bit rudderless." 
Boyle stated, "I handled it very very badly and I have apologised to Ewan for it. I felt a great shame about it and how it was handled."

Members of the cast and crew were involved in a boating accident during production. It was reported that the incident involved both Boyle and DiCaprio. No one was injured.

The beach seen in the film is not the same as in real life. There is a gap between mountains on the actual beach in Thailand. The special effects crew digitally added some of the surrounding mountains during the post-production phase.

The waterfall scene, where DiCaprio and others jump from a high cliff to the water below, was filmed in Khao Yai National Park in central Thailand, at the Haew Suwat Waterfall.

The map in the film was illustrated by the author of the book that The Beach was based upon, Alex Garland. He received credit for this as the cartographer.

In 1999, Hélène de Fougerolles auditioned for the film but casting directors immediately told her that she was not mysterious enough for the character as she arrived with blond hair in pigtails. She asked them if she could "be an extra or serve coffees there, three months in Thailand, it sounds idyllic!". Although firstly reluctant because the actress was already established in the industry, they finally accepted. As journalists were not allowed to come take pictures on set, the only picture the press could have of Guillaume Canet and Virginie Ledoyen before shooting started was their departure at Paris airport with de Fougerolles. They made it the cover of Studio Magazine, from which the international press reported her as officially cast. This eventually lent her lines edited out of the final cut but present in the DVD extras.

Release
The film opened February 11, 2000 in both the United Kingdom and the United States.

The budget of the film was US$50 million. The film opened at number 2 at the box office in both the UK and the US, with a weekend gross of $15,277,921 in the United States and Canada behind Scream 3, and a gross of £2,418,321 in the United Kingdom behind Toy Story 2. Global takings totaled over US$144 million, of which US$39 million was from the United States and Canada.

Home video
The film has been released on VHS and DVD. It was released on Blu-ray in Spain in October 2022 . The standard DVD release included nine scenes that were deleted from the film, including an alternative opening which to an extent resembles the one in the novel. These  were later included in a Special Edition DVD release, along with Danny Boyle's commentary on what might have been their purpose. There is also an alternative ending which depicts Sal committing suicide and everyone loading up on a boat from the raft.

Soundtrack

The soundtrack for the film, co-produced by Pete Tong, features the international hits "Pure Shores" by All Saints and "Porcelain" by Moby, as well as tracks by New Order, Blur, Underworld, Orbital, Faithless, Sugar Ray, and others. Leftfield's contribution to the soundtrack, "Snakeblood", was found to have sampled Orchestral Manoeuvres in the Dark's "Almost" without permission, leading to a lawsuit; band member Neil Barnes said he forgot to remove the sample from the finished track. The songs "Synasthasia" by Junkie XL, "Out of Control" by The Chemical Brothers, "Fiesta Conga" by Movin' Melodies, "Redemption Song" by Bob Marley, "Neon Reprise" by Lunatic Calm and "Smoke Two Joints" by Chris Kay and Michael Kay were also included in the movie but omitted from the soundtrack. The teaser trailer for the film featured "Touched" by VAST.

The film score was composed by Angelo Badalamenti, and a separate album containing selections of his score was released as well.

Track listing

Year-end charts

Certifications

Reception
The website's critical consensus reads, "The Beach is unfocused and muddled, a shallow adaptation of the novel it is based on. Points go to the gorgeous cinematography, though." On Metacritic, the film has a weighted average score of 43 out of 100, based on 34 critics, indicating "mixed or average reviews".

Critics suggested that DiCaprio's fame post-Titanic might have contributed to the financial success of this film, which came out less than three years after the James Cameron blockbuster. CNN's Paul Clinton said "Leonardo DiCaprio's main fan base of screaming adolescent girls won't be disappointed with The Beach. The majority of the film displays the titanic-sized young heartthrob sans his shirt in this story about the pseudo-angst and alienation of a young man from the United States escaping civilization and his computer-obsessed generation." He agreed with most others that The Beach was "nothing to write home about". DiCaprio was nominated for a Razzie Award for Worst Actor for his work on the film.

Controversies

Damage to filming location
Controversy arose during the making of the film due to 20th Century Fox's bulldozing and landscaping of the natural beach setting of Ko Phi Phi Le to make it more "paradise-like". The production altered some sand dunes and cleared some coconut trees and grass to widen the beach. Fox set aside a fund to reconstruct and return the beach to its natural state; however, lawsuits were filed by environmentalists who believed the damage to the ecosystem was permanent and restoration attempts had failed.  Following shooting of the film, there was a clear flat area at one end of the beach that was created artificially with an odd layout of trees which was never rectified, and the entire area remained damaged from the original state until the tsunami of 2004.

The lawsuits dragged on for years. In 2006, Thailand's Supreme Court upheld an appellate court ruling that the filming had harmed the environment and ordered that damage assessments be made. Defendants in the case included 20th Century Fox and some Thai government officials.

The large increase in tourist traffic to the beach as a result of the film resulted in environmental damage to the bay and the nearby coral reefs, prompting Thai authorities to close the beach in 2018.

The restoration period for the bay was lengthened due to travel restrictions during the COVID pandemic. Blacktip sharks began breeding there again. In 2022, the bay reopened to tourists, under strict protocols of no boats, no swimming and no more than a one hour visit per person for a limited number of visitors at a time.

Portrayal of Thailand
After the film premiered in Thailand in 2000, some Thai politicians were upset at the way Thailand was depicted in the film and called for it to be banned. The depiction of the drug culture was said to give Thailand a bad image and having a statue of Buddha in a bar was cited as "blasphemous".

Possible spin-off
In a 2019 interview with The Independent, Danny Boyle revealed that a television series based on his film has been written by Amy Seimetz. The proposed series is set to take place before the events from the 1996 novel, although it will be updated to occur 20 years later, in 2016.

See also

 Phi Phi Islands

References

External links

 
 
 
 
 
 Where was ‘The Beach’ Filmed?
 Storming ‘The Beach’, Rolf Potts, Salon.com
 Movie Page Review
 Entertainment Weekly Review
 CNN Review

2000 films
2000s adventure drama films
2000s thriller drama films
American adventure drama films
British adventure drama films
British thriller drama films
2000 psychological thriller films
British films about cannabis
Films set in Thailand
Films shot in Thailand
Films based on British novels
Films directed by Danny Boyle
20th Century Fox films
Films set on beaches
Films set on islands
Films scored by Angelo Badalamenti
Films with screenplays by John Hodge
Films about vacationing
Seafaring films
Shark attacks in fiction
Films about secret societies
Utopian films
Films set in Bangkok
Films about seafaring accidents or incidents
2000 drama films
Film controversies in Thailand
2000s English-language films
2000s American films
2000s British films